Kristy Sarah Scott (born May 17, 1995) is an American social media personality, digital creator, filmmaker and entrepreneur. In 2023, Kristy Scott made the Forbes 30 Under 30 list for social media influencers.

Background and education 
Scott was born in Texas to Trinidadian and Scottish parents. She is of mixed race. She graduated from high school early, immediately after turning 17 years old, with college credits. She would go on to graduate from the University of Houston, earning a Bachelor of Computer Information Systems degree at the age of 20.

Career 

Before becoming a social media content creator, she worked as an IT engineer post university graduation. She left working in the ICT industry to pursue social media content creation full time. She began her content creating career by posting videos alongside her husband and kids. Her content focuses family oriented fun and reactions, and home design, aesthetics and renovation. She has gone viral with several of her videos posted on social media, including pranking her husband with a cake designed as a chicken, and creating a makeshift playhouse for her kids. She and her husband post as @kristy.sarah on Instagram  and TikTok, and on Youtube as @itsthescotts. She was included on the Forbes 30 under 30 social media category in North America for 2023.

Scott released her personalized planner in a collaborative effort with notebook maker North + Third. The planner, which was a 6-month, 174-page scheduling format, included pages for setting goals, bucket lists, managing ones projects, budgeting; alongside the conventional weekly and monthly pages of the calendar.

She and her husband were guests at the 64th Annual Grammy Awards that was held at MGM Grand Garden Arena on 3 April 2022 in Las Vegas, Nevada.

Personal life 

She married Desmond Scott in 2014. Together, they have two sons - Vance and Westen.

References

External links

1995 births
Living people
People from Texas
University of Houston alumni
Social media influencers
Instagram accounts
21st-century American women
American TikTokers
American YouTubers
YouTube vloggers